Narong Wisetsri (born October 1, 1976) is a professional footballer from Thailand. He currently plays for Kanjanapat in the Thai League 3.

Honours

Club
Thai Port F.C.
 Thai FA Cup winner (1) : 2009
 Thai League Cup winner (1) : 2010

External links
Profile at Thaipremierleague.co.th
https://int.soccerway.com/players/narong-wisetsri/119040/

1976 births
Living people
Narong Wisetsri
Narong Wisetsri
Association football goalkeepers
Narong Wisetsri
Narong Wisetsri
Narong Wisetsri
Narong Wisetsri
Narong Wisetsri
Narong Wisetsri